Ivo Zorman (3 May 1926 – 14 January 2009) was a Slovene writer and editor. He wrote short stories and novels as well as radio plays.

Zorman was born in the village of Gora near Komenda in central Slovenia in 1926. He went to school in Ljubljana and as a young man participated in the Slovene resistance and joined the Partisans. After the war he worked as a teacher for a while and then an editor until his retirement in 1977. He often used themes from his experiences in the war in his work. One of his best-known novels is Draga moja Iza (Μy Dear Iza) which was made into a film in 1979. He died in Kamnik in 2009.

In 1969 he won the Levstik Award for his book V tem mesecu se osipa mak (This is the Month the Poppies Scatter).

Published works

 Adult Prose
 Trije Borjanovi (The Borjan Three), 1955
 Čez dvajset let bo vse drugače (In Twenty Years All Will Be Different), 1968
 Pedagoška komedija (The Educational Comedy), 1971
 Draga moja Iza (My Dear Iza), 1973
 Sončnica navadna (The Plain Sunflower), 1974
 Stric Benjamin (Uncle Benjamin), 1977
 Medved z budilko (The Bear with an Alarm Clock), 1982
 Vonj po jeseni (Smell of Autumn), 1978
 Dom človekov (A Man's Home), 1981
 Kdo bo meni prižgal sveče (Who Shall Light Candles for Me), 1982
 Portret revolucionarja Malusa (A Portrait of Malus the Revolutionary), 1985
 Leta herojev (Years of Heroes), 1988
 Lectovo srce (Lebkuchen Heart), 1989
 V znamenju tehtnice (In the Sign of Virgo), 1989
 Stiska bogov (Anguish of the Gods), 1991
 Donata (Donata), 1991
 Kajnov rod (Cain's Clan), 1991
 Vila Bagari (Villa Bagari), 1997
 Ko odletijo lastovke (When The Swallows Fly Away), 1999
 Okus po marcipanu (A Taste of Marzipan), 2002

 Prose for Young Readers
 Iz obroča (Out of the Ring), 1953
 Svobodni gozdovi (Free Forests), 1954
 Eno samo je življenje (We Only Live Once), 1963
 Na senčni strani mesta (On the Shady Side of Town), 1967
 Gnezdo sršenov (A Hornets' Nest), 1968
 V tem mesecu se osipa mak (This is the Month the Poppies Scatter), 1969
 V sedemnajstem (At Seventeen), 1972
 Storžkovo popoldne (Storžek's Afternoon), 1973
 Rosni zaliv (Dew Bay), 1975
 Tinčevi divji doživljaji (Little Tine's Wild Adventures), 1978
 Naši kurirji (Our Partisan Couriers), 1978
 Uporne Dražgoše (Dražgoše the Village That Rebelled), 1978
 Bolničarka Vida (Vida the Partisan Nurse), 1978
 Rada bi bila velika (I Would Like to Grow Up), 1979
 Obveščevalec Lesnika (Lesnika the Informer), 1979
 Deklica iz Mihovega mlina (The Girl from Miha's Mill), 1982
 Hrčki smrčki (Sniffy Hamsters), 1983
 Oh, ta naša babica (Oh, This Granny of Ours), 1986
 Sla po letenju (A Desire to Fly), 1987
 Račka Puhačka (Fluffy Duckling), 1988
 Ded Nil in teta Filipa (Grandpa Nil and Aunt Phillipa), 1989
 Bolečina odraščanja (Growing Pains), 1993

References

Slovenian writers
Slovenian editors
1926 births
2009 deaths
Levstik Award laureates
People from the Municipality of Komenda